Oris Erhuero (Born 23 September 1968) is a British actor, producer, writer, and fashion model.  After modelling for several years, he transitioned into television and film, with roles in The Adventures of Sinbad, The Bill, Highlander: Endgame, Sometimes in April. and the latest Award winning film Redcon-1, where Oris was awarded as Best Actor  Oris Erhuero own his film production company and is the head designer of bespoke jewellery.

Early life
Oris Erhuero was born in Finsbury Park, London, and is the oldest of seven children. Attended Beaufoy Boys School Kennington and later classically trained in the Fashion Drama and Arts He came to notoriety in the Hollywood circuit in the early 90s of the back of a mega worldwide successful modelling trail in London, New York, Paris and Milan.

Career

Early career

Erhuero left London for United States where he was introduced to the Fashion Industry. 
As one of the most photographed male black models
 of his era with his very strong recognisable face as his signature look and the ability to transform as a chameleon. He rapidly acquired campaigns for clients in the world fashion industry including Christian Dior, Armani, the late Gianfranco Ferré, Gianni Versace, Gaultier, Moschino, Diesel, Vivienne Westwood and Romeo Gigli. Further more in commercials such as Coca-Cola, Gatorade.
Oris was then, and still is, recognised through endless cinema and TV ads. Through the years Erhuero has shot with the likes of A-list photographers such as the late Bob Carlos Clarke, Nick Knight and Rankin and with award-winning directors such as Raoul Peck and Guy Richie.

1995–2007

Erhuero obtained a series regular role of Rongar in the television series The Adventures of Sinbad  which began his career breakthrough. He played the role of Winston in Highlander: Endgame.
Erhuero has also worked on several television shows in both England and United States as E-Ring and The District.
In 2005 the Oscar Award nominated director Raoul Peck showed case his talent in the Golden Globe and NAACP nominated HBO film Sometimes in April
 
which was based on the 1994 Rwandan genocide and he was nominated 
 for a Black Reel Award for Best Supporting Actor

2008–present

In 2008, Erhuero left Los Angeles and returned to London for additional acting roles.  He made first British television debut on the television crime drama series of The Bill and on stage in the award-winning play The Diary of Black men.
In 2016, Oris won the UK screen nation's best leading actor award for the African Academy Award movie The Cursed Ones¨. In the same year, he was also nominated as best leading actor for the awarded Best West African Movie Road to Yesterday, currently five stars Netflix movie and one of the most viewed films on the major transatlantic airlines.
Currently, Oris is working on several productions due to be released in 2017–2018, such as the high-octane action horror film "Redcon1 Zombie Apocalypse" and in many interesting performances, such as "Love in the age of fear" directed by Antonio Riberio. Oris is showing consistent maturity and growth as an actor who is constantly searching for ways to broaden and define new horizons.

Filmography

{| class="wikitable" |}
|-
! Year || Movie || Role ||Notes
|-
| 1996 || The Adventures of Sinbad || Rongar || As one of the leading actors of the show
|-
| 2000 || Highlander: Endgame || Winston || At the North American box office, the film opened at No. 5, grossing $6,223,330 in its opening weekend. It went on to gross $12,811,858 domestically and gather $3,031,750 from international markets for a worldwide total of $15,843,608
|-
| 2000 || Titus / "Surprise Party" || DEA Agent || Nominated TV Show Primetime Emmy 2002
|-
| 2002 || V.I.P. / "Die Bodyguards" || Saghal || Won Daytime Emmy 2002
|-
| 2002 || The District (TV Series)|Payback || Tyrell Wilson || Nominated Primetime Emmy 2001
|-
| 2002 || Crossing Jordan (TV Series)| "Fire and Ice" || Fireman || Won ASCAP Film and Television Music Awards 2002 and 2004
|-
| 2002 || Black Mask 2 || "Wolf" || Voiced by Sean Lau in the Cantonese dub version
|-
| 2003 || Lotta || King || 
|-
| 2002 || The Orlando Jones Show || "Baby Daddy" ||
|-
| 2003 || One on One / "I Hear White People" || Mr. James || Nominated Image Award 2003
|-
| 2004 || A Lousy Ten Grand || Cleon || 
|-
| 2005 || Sometimes in April || Honoré ||  Black Reel Award nomination Best Supporting Actor, 
Golden Globe and NAACP nominated best Film
|-
| 2005 || Joe Willie's Friend || Michael ||
|-
| 2005 || The Gold Bracelet || The Man ||
|-
| 2005 || E-Ring || Guest Star || Won Primetime Emmy 2006
|-
| 2006 || Hurricane in the Rose Garden || Warrior 
|-
| 2009 || The Bill (TV Series) / "Prodigal Son" || Linton Barry || TV Show Won BAFTA TV Award 2009, Nominated in 2001, 2004, 2005 and 2008
|-
| 2009 || Moloch Tropical || John Baker || Nominated Best Film Sydney Film Festival
|-
| 2010 || Chicago Pulaski Jones || "Tornado" || 
|-
| 2013 || "Strike Back" (TV Series) || Brigadier General Lewis / Colonel Lewis || Nominated TV Show Primetime Emmy 2010
|-
| 2015 || The Cursed Ones || Godwin Ezeudu || Won Screen Nation Film and Television Award Favorite Male Screen Personality, 
AMAA nominated Best Actor in a Leading Role, 
Executive Producer
|-
| 2015 ||  Road to Yesterday || Izu || Won for Best West African Movie, Nominated Best leading actor Ghana Movie Award
|-
| 2017 ||  Redcon1- Zombie Apocalypse || Captain Marcus Stanton || Won Best Actor HBO UASE Festival, Official feature of Raindance Film Festival. 
|-
| 2018 ||  Love of the age of fear || ||Post Production
|-
| 2018 ||  Untitled Project || || Post Production
|-
| 2022 ||  The Invitation || Isaac || Filming
</TABLE>

References

External links

Screen Nation
Black Reel Award
Official Website Black Reel Award
The Foundation for the Augmentation of African-Americans in Film
Adventures of Sinbad
In April
Screen Nation
Screen Nation Awards Winners 2016
Highlander Endgame 
Black Mask 2
Road to Yesterday
The Cursed Ones
Road to Yesterday
The Adventures of Sinbad
Sometimes in April
Sometimes in April

Living people
1968 births
English male film actors
English male models
Black British male actors
English people of Nigerian descent